Experience management is an effort by organizations to measure and improve the experiences they provide to customers as well as stakeholders like vendors, suppliers, employees, and shareholders. The concept posits the notion that  experiences comprise distinct economic offerings that create economic value and competitive advantage.

Organizations have begun to collect experience data in addition to operational data, since experiences are seen as a competitive advantage. Experience management platforms provide various services to automate the process of identifying and improving experiences across an organization.

Broader than customer experience, experience management now encompasses customer experience along with other areas, such as brand experience, employee experience and product experience, which are all seen as interrelated.

History

In 1994 Steve Haeckel and Lou Carbone collaborated on a seminal early article on experience management, titled "Engineering Customer Experiences", where they defined experience as "the 'takeaway' impression formed by people's encounters  with  products,  services  and  businesses a perception produced  when  humans  consolidate  sensory  information." They argued that the new approach must focus on total experience as the key customer value proposition.

The concept reached a wide audience in 1999, when it was popularized by B. Joseph Pine II and James H. Gilmore in their book Experience Economy. In the same year, Bernd Schmitt published Experiential Marketing: How to Get Customers to Sense, Feel, Think, Act, and Relate to Your Company and Brands.

In the 2000s, experience management emerged as a complex field unifying the experiences of brands, employees, products and more. It was acknowledged that generating new experiences for end customers requires designing better experiences for internal players of an organization. Value is created by focusing on the experiences of everyone involved in or affected by a new offer, such as customers, employees, suppliers, and other stakeholders.

Management

To create and manage the experiences, businesses must evaluate, implement, integrate, and build experiences from a fragmented landscape. Such needs are met by experience management platforms, which help automate the process of measuring and improving experiences across an organization by coordinating content, customer data and core services, and unifying marketing, commerce and service processes.

Experience management platforms compare multiple layers of data and statistics to enable organizations to identify any experience gaps. They connect operational databases with human feedback, analyzing respondents' emotions, beliefs, and sentiments for a holistic view of the experiences they provide. Their methods include artificial intelligence, predictive analytics, and statistical models.

Other uses

While the term experience management is predominantly used in business, it has another meaning. It is used for a special kind of knowledge management that deals with collecting, modeling, storing, reusing, evaluating, and maintaining experience. In that sense, the term is interchangeable with expertise management.

References

Corporate governance
Customer experience